Nikki Tyler (born December 4, 1972 in Berkeley, California) is a former pornographic actress best known for her work in the 1990s and for her selection as the December 1995 Penthouse Pet of the Month.

Career
Tyler became Penthouse magazine's Pet of the Year in 1995. After her Vivid contract, she went on to work for companies such as Wicked Pictures and Adam & Eve. According to IAFD, her last film was in 2003.

Personal life
Aged 21, Tyler married a man who worked at a newspaper stand. While married, she also had an off-screen lesbian relationship with porn actress Jenna Jameson. The couple lived together for a number of years before they separated. Jameson continued to see Tyler even during the period when she got involved with Jay Grdina. Tyler retired from the industry in the early 2000s. As of 2004, she is living with her husband and daughter in California.

References

External links
 
 
 
 

1972 births
American female adult models
American pornographic film actresses
Living people
Penthouse Pets
Actresses from Berkeley, California
Pornographic film actors from California

21st-century American women